John Hedley may refer to:
 John Hedley (bishop), British Benedictine and writer
 John Herbert Hedley, World War I flying ace dubbed "The Luckiest Man Alive"

See also

Jack Hedley (disambiguation)